Town and Country (and variants) may refer to:

Business
 Town & Country Club (Saint Paul, Minnesota), a golf club in St. Paul, Minnesota
 Town & Country Food Stores, a chain of convenience stores headquartered in San Angelo, Texas
 Town & Country Mall (fl. 1990s), a mall in Houston, Texas
 Town & Country Village (Houston), a shopping center in Houston, Texas
 Town and Country Shopping Center (Kettering), a mall in Kettering, Ohio
 Town & Country Shopping Center, one of United States' first (Opened March 1, 1949) regional shopping centers, located in Whitehall, Ohio
 Town & Country, a discount store owned by Lane Bryant

Entertainment
 Town and Country (album), a 1969 album by Humble Pie
 Town & Country (band), an American rock band
 Town & Country (film), a 2001 film starring Warren Beatty and Diane Keaton
 Town & Country (magazine), an American magazine
 Town and Country Magazine, a British monthly magazine
 Town and Country (play), 1807 play by Thomas Morton

Towns
 Town 'n' Country, Florida
 Town and Country, Missouri
 Town and Country, Washington

Other
 The Town & Country Club, a live music venue in London
 Chrysler Town & Country, a minivan manufactured by Chrysler
 Chrysler Town & Country (1941–1988), cars manufactured by Chrysler